Serhiy Ilarionovych Zaytsev (born 13 April 1974) is a former Ukrainian professional football defender who played for different Ukrainian and foreign clubs.

Career
Zaytsev is product of youth team sistem Metalurh Zaporizhzhia. His first coach was Volodymyr Kocheharov. Zaytsev had a brief spell with Pogoń Szczecin during 1999, appearing as a substitute in one Ekstraklasa match.

References

External links
 Profile at Official FC Metalurh Site (Rus)
 
 

1974 births
Living people
Footballers from Zaporizhzhia
Soviet footballers
Ukrainian footballers
FC Olympik Kharkiv players
FC Torpedo Zaporizhzhia players
FC Metalurh Zaporizhzhia players
FC Metalist Kharkiv players
FC Neftekhimik Nizhnekamsk players
Pogoń Szczecin players
1. FC Tatran Prešov players
ŠK Futura Humenné players
AS Trenčín players
FC VSS Košice players
FC Atyrau players
FC Ekibastuz players
FC Kaisar players
FC Ros Bila Tserkva players
Soviet Second League B players
Ukrainian Premier League players
Ukrainian First League players
Ukrainian Second League players
Russian First League players
Slovak Super Liga players
2. Liga (Slovakia) players
Ekstraklasa players
Kazakhstan Premier League players
Kazakhstan First Division players
Association football defenders
Ukrainian expatriate footballers
Expatriate footballers in Russia
Expatriate footballers in Poland
Expatriate footballers in Slovakia
Expatriate footballers in Kazakhstan
Ukrainian expatriate sportspeople in Russia
Ukrainian expatriate sportspeople in Poland
Ukrainian expatriate sportspeople in Slovakia
Ukrainian expatriate sportspeople in Kazakhstan
Ukrainian football managers
Ukrainian expatriate football managers
Expatriate football managers in Kazakhstan
Expatriate football managers in Moldova
Ukrainian expatriate sportspeople in Moldova
Expatriate football managers in Poland
Ukrainian Premier League managers
Ukrainian First League managers
Kazakhstan Premier League managers
Kazakhstan First Division managers
FC Metalurh Zaporizhzhia managers
CSF Bălți managers
FC Karpaty Lviv managers
FC Akzhayik managers
Moldovan Super Liga managers
Legionovia Legionowo managers
II liga managers